Fabio De Crignis (born 7 April 1968) is an Italian former alpine skier who competed in the 1992 Winter Olympics.

Career
In his career in the World Cup has achieved 20 top 10 results and two podiums, all these in slalom. He finished 2nd in the 1989–90 FIS Alpine Ski Europa Cup overall.

World Cup results
Podiums

References

External links
 
 

1968 births
Living people
Italian male alpine skiers
Olympic alpine skiers of Italy
Alpine skiers at the 1992 Winter Olympics
Alpine skiers of Fiamme Gialle